Maloku is an Albanian language surname. Notable people with the surname include:

Elvir Maloku (born 1996), Croatian footballer
Enver Maloku (1954–1999), Kosovan journalist
Naim Maloku (born 1958), Kosovan journalist

References